Irondi Mantovani Pugliesi (3 August 1947 – 12 April 2021) was a Brazilian politician and member of the Democratic Movement Party.

Biography
She served as a member of the Legislative Assembly of Paraná from 1995 to 1999 and 1983–1991.

She died on 12 April 2021, from COVID-19 in Arapongas during the COVID-19 pandemic in Brazil.

References

1947 births
2021 deaths
Brazilian politicians
Members of the Legislative Assembly of Paraná
Deaths from the COVID-19 pandemic in Paraná (state)

Brazilian people of Italian descent